Sufyan is an Arabic name.
Muhammad Sufyan Qasmi (born 1954), Indian Islamic scholar, rector of Darul Uloom Waqf, Deoband
Nader Sufyan Abbas (born 1975), Qatari weightlifter
Abu Sufyan Al-Azdi (1973–2013), Saudi Arabian deputy leader of the terrorist group Al-Qaeda in the Arabian Peninsula
Khaled bin Sufyan Al-Hathali belonged to the Banu Lahyan tribe at the time of the Islamic Prophet Muhammad
Abu Sufyan ibn Harb (560–652), leader of the Quraish tribe of Mecca
Muawiyah ibn-abi-Sufyan or Muawiyah I (602–680) established the Umayyad Dynasty of the caliphate
Sufyan Ben Qumu or Abu Sufian bin Qumu (born 1959), citizen of Libya held in Guantanamo Bay detention camps, in Cuba
Abu Sufyan ibn al-Harith, son of Ḥārith ibn Abd al-Muttalib and a sahaba (companion) and a cousin of Muhammad
Ramla bint Abi Sufyan (c. 594–666), a wife of Muhammad and therefore a Mother of the Believers
Sufjan Stevens (born 1975), American singer
Sufyan al-Thawri (716–778), tabi'i Islamic scholar, Hafiz and jurist, founder of the Thawri madhhab
Sufyan ibn `Uyaynah (725–814), prominent eighth-century Islamic religious scholar from Mecca
Yazid ibn Abi Sufyan, one of the companions of Muhammad
Yazid Ibn Muawiyah Ibn Abu Sufyan or Yazid I, (647–683), the second Caliph of the Umayyad Caliphate
Ziyad ibn Abi Sufyan (died 673 AD), Muslim general and administrator and a member of the clan of the Umayyads

See also
Harf Sufyan District, district of the 'Amran Governorate, Yemen
Sufan (disambiguation)
Sufyani
Sofiane (disambiguation)